Business Day, established in 2001, is a daily business newspaper based in Lagos. 
It is the only Nigerian newspaper with a bureau in Accra, Ghana. 
It has both daily and Sunday titles. It circulates in Nigeria and Ghana.

Publisher
The publisher of Businessday, Frank Aigbogun, a former editor of the Vanguard newspaper. The editor of the daily paper is Tayo Fagbule. Lolade Akinmurele  is the deputy editor supported by several assistant editors. Chuks Oluigbo is the online editor while the editor of the Sunday title is Zebulon Agomuo. 
The newspaper has creative writers such as Iheanyi Nwachukwu, Onyinye Nwachukwu, Jumoke Akiyode, Chuka Uroko, Ifeoma Okeke, Hope Moses Ashike, Olusola Bello, Odinaka Anudu, Obinna Emelike, Teliat Sule, and Chuks Oluigbo, among others.

The newspaper has produced many award-winning journalists. Obodo Ejiro, Teliat Sule and Peter Olowa all distinguished themselves by winning the Citi Journalistic Award for excellence in financial journalism, while Iheanyi Nwachukwu and Patrick Atuanya won the Securities and Exchange Commission Capital Market Essay Competition in 2012 and 2013 respectively.

Anthony Osae-Brown, a former editor, was a finalist for Best Business News Story in May 2011, a Diageo Africa Business Reporting Award. 
Godwin Nnanna, a former assistant editor, has won several international journalism awards including gold and silver medals in UN Foundation Prize for humanitarian and development reporting, and the Elizabeth Neuffer Memorial Prize for written media.

The newspaper worked with PricewaterhouseCoopers on the "Most Respected Company and CEO" survey in 2006. Survey results showed the opinions of Nigerian CEOs. Awards based on the survey were presented in a ceremony in Lagos.
In February 2011, Business Day organized its annual Capital Market conference.
In March 2011 the newspaper organized the Business Day SME Forum 2011 in Lagos. The forum was attended by entrepreneurs, consultants, financiers and representatives from various industries.

References

External links 
 

Economy of Nigeria
Publications established in 2001
2001 establishments in Nigeria
Companies based in Lagos
Newspapers published in Lagos
English-language newspapers published in Africa
Daily newspapers published in Nigeria